The Uluguru bushbaby (Paragalago orinus), also known as the mountain dwarf galago or the Amani dwarf galago, is a species of primate in the family Galagidae. Like all galagos, it is a strepsirrhine primate. It is endemic to the Eastern Arc Mountains of Kenya and Tanzania at altitudes of 1,200 - 2,000 m. It has its own set of unique calls, which helps distinguish it from other species of bushbaby.

Taxonomy 
Formerly classified as a subspecies of Prince Demidoff's bushbaby, the Uluguru bushbaby was recognised as a separate species in 1995 based on its unique call. It has been closely grouped with the Ukinga galago (not yet formally described) and the Mughese dwarf galago (P. o. mughese) due to their similar calls, overlapping habitual areas and physical resemblance.

Description 
The Uluguru bushbaby weighs between 74 and 98 g and has head-body length of 125–138 mm. The tail is relatively short, measuring 169–199 mm, short-haired, reddish at the base and darker at the tip, and of uniform thickness. The fur is dark reddish, with a yellow-white face strip and dark brown eye rings. The muzzle also appears 'turned up', similar to Prince Demidoff's bushbaby. The hindfoot is very short, measuring around 60mm in males.

Calls 
Like most types of bushbabies, the Uluguru bushbaby has its own set of unique calls that distinguishes it from other species. It is most commonly heard at dusk, but the alarm call has been heard throughout the night.

Conservation 
The Uluguru bushbaby is classified by the IUCN as vulnerable, with the population being widespread, but fragmented, often found at low densities. Overall extent of occurrence appears to be declining. The main threats are deforestation, most commonly for logging and conversion into agricultural land. The species is present in multiple protected areas that have been established to combat deforestation, such as Udzungwa Mountains National Park and the Taita Hills forest reserve.

The species is listed in Appendix II of CITES.

Presence of the Uluguru bushbaby in the Taita Hills 
The Taita Hills have become a big point of interest in Kenya due to its unusually high density of endangered species, though due to human influences the indigenous forests are now highly fragmented and the remaining areas of forest are small.

However, despite the large amount of biodiversity within the Taita Hills, no surveys of bushbabies have ever been undertaken, so for a long time, the actual presence of the Uluguru bushbaby within this mountain range was unknown. However, as time passed and more species of bushbaby were discovered and made their own taxon (Largely due to extensive research into their vocalisations, reproductive anatomy and genetics), as well as the fact that the presence of the Uluguru bushbaby was already known around some parts of Tanzania (Particularly at other parts of the Eastern Arc Mountains, which the Taita Hills, along with Mount Sagala and Mount Kasigau, make up the north-easternmost part of, their presence had been realised, along with two other species of bushbaby (Paragalago rondoensis and Paragalago udzungwensis). It is possible that these observations may be of a new subspecies of the Uluguru bushbaby, being names the Taita dwarf mountain galago, however this has not been formally identified.

References

Uluguru bushbaby
Mammals of Tanzania
Mammals of Kenya
Near threatened animals
Vulnerable biota of Africa
Uluguru bushbaby
Taxonomy articles created by Polbot